Wild Seed may refer to:

Wild Seed (novel), a 1980 science fiction novel by Octavia E. Butler
Wild Seed (album), a 1995 album by Norwegian singer Morten Harket
Wild Seed (film), a 1965 film starring Michael Parks and Celia Kaye
"Wild Seed", a track from the Rage album Reflections of a Shadow